Anand is a 2004 Indian Telugu-language drama film written and directed Sekhar Kammula. Produced jointly by Amigos Creations and National Film Development Corporation of India, the film stars Raja and Kamalinee Mukherjee. The film begins with the death of the family of a young girl as a result of a character's drunken driving. The film sketches the path of the young girl growing up into a woman who lives her life independently and with self-esteem. How the male protagonist enters the woman's life and how they fall in love with each other forms the rest of the story.

The film's basic story was also chosen as the subject for Sekhar Kammula's thesis screenplay, which was a requirement for his Master of Fine Arts at Howard University. The film was screened at the International Film Festival of India in the mainstream section.

The film was well received by critics and became successful at the box office. It was remade in Tamil as Ninaithale. The film went on to win the Nandi Awards among several other prominent awards. If the award-winning Dollar Dreams (2000) set the tone, then Anand introduced the legacy of successful films made with simple stories. The film's soundtrack was well appreciated for its soft melodies.

Plot
Roopa is a woman with self-respect, determined at her decisions, and yet lovable and sensitive. She works in an ad agency along with teaching classical music part-time. Along with Anita, she also works on weekends at a nursery. After losing her parents at a young age, she fends for herself.

She is engaged to Rahul, a rich Marwari whom she fell in love with. On the night of the wedding, she is confronted with Rahul's mother who insists Roopa to wear a North Indian dress. Roopa, however, has always desired to wear her mother's sari for her wedding. The argument turns ugly while Rahul keeps mum tacitly supporting his mother. Roopa finally decides to call off the marriage after realizing that her freedom and individuality are not being respected by them.

Anand is the son of a rich industrialist who unintentionally killed Roopa's parents in a car accident, thereby losing mental stability. Anand brings his father to Roopa's wedding hoping that his blessings for the wedded couple would bring solace to his soul. At the wedding, however, Anand witnesses the turn of events and finds that Roopa is the woman for him. In order to try his luck in wooing Roopa, he drops his studies in the US and decides to move into a room next to her house. They frown, fight, argue with each other all through his stay there. Anita who is aware of Anand's love for Roopa helps him by giving tips to get closer to her.

A few months later, Rahul's mother dies and Roopa is the one he approaches to seek solace. She gives all the support as a friend to Rahul during his difficult days. On the other hand, the affection between Anand and Roopa is on and off, with arguments on trivial issues. Anand continues to put in his efforts till one day drunken Rahul appears at Roopa's house only to forcibly convince her to marry him. Anand gets frustrated and kicks him out of the house and blames her for choosing Rahul over him. Trying to win back the love of Anand, she cooks for him. Anand rejects and leaves the house. After a few days, they both meet again at a Dandiya night, where Roopa confesses her love to him. Later, Anand reveals that his father is responsible for her parents' death. Though she was shocked by learning this, she decides to forgive that event and move on with her life and agrees to marry Anand.

Cast
 Raja as Anand
 Kamalinee Mukherjee as Roopa (Voice by Sunitha)
 Satya Krishnan as Anita, Roopa's friend
 Anish Kuruvilla as Raju, Anand's cousin
 Anuj Gurwara as Rahul, Roopa's ex-fiancée
 Bakhitha Francis as Samatha, Anand's little friend
 Chandana Chakrabarti as Rahul's mother
 Gopichand Lagadapati as Ram
 Gururaj Manepalli as Anand's father
Sekhar Kammula as auto driver (cameo appearance)
 Shankar Melkote as Roopa's boss

Production

Financing
After Sekhar Kammula's first venture, Dollar Dreams (2000), he began meeting producers with his stories. When he initially told them a story, they felt that it was too simple. Then, he began giving them a bound script of Anand. Unfortunately, none came forward to produce it. Upon someone's suggestion, Kammula approached National Film Development Corporation (NFDC) and they came forward to fund a part of the project. This set a precedent because it was the first time that NFDC entered into commercial Telugu cinema.

Anish Kuruvilla, who played Anand's cousin in the film, was the executive producer for the film and Kammula's following film, Godavari (2006).

Casting and locations
Kammula preferred actors who suit the roles than writing characters for established actors. Hence, the choice of the cast were non-established actors. The search process lasted 3 months. The casting for Raja was simple. Kammula wanted someone without melodrama in acting and it just came as a plus when Raja appreciated Kammula's directorial abilities. The choice for an actress made Kammula visit Mumbai and Bangalore, but he could not get the appropriate one. On knowing about Kamalinee Mukherjee, he subjected her to a screen test. After the test, he selected her as the actress in the lead role. The choice of location was first thought as Ramoji Film City and Nanakramguda in Hyderabad. So, these thoughts were quashed because the need was for a suitably big house and an outhouse situated adjacent to it. Since Kammula stayed in Padmarao Nagar, a prominent locality in Hyderabad, a location there made it all the more accessible for him.

Miscellaneous
Kammula's primary inspiration came from the Indian middle class. He was of the thought that this section of people were wrongly represented in films. He wanted to represent them appropriately and this was achieved with Anand.

Kammula sat with Veturi for writing songs for the film. Kammula said that he could see thousands of expressions expressed as a couple of words in lyrics. Eventually, they ended up with six beautiful songs penned by Veturi. For Anand, Veturi took a month to come up with the lyrics as against his usual penchant of coming up with lyrics spontaneously.

Being a Bengali, there was a need for someone to dub Kamalinee Mukherjee's voice for the film. This was provided by a well-known singer and television host, Sunitha. The voice of Sunitha blended so well with the screen presence of Kamalinee that she went on to win an award for it.

With most of the cast not well-versed in speaking Telugu, Kammula faced challenges in their dialogue delivery. It just happened that most of the cast couldn't speak Telugu. The crew had to face a slight loss of the performance owing to this fact. To overcome this handicap, the dialogues were altered slightly to improve the actors' diction.

Release

Critical acclaim and reviews
Anand had a relatively low-profile release unlike the huge banner releases of the Telugu film industry. It was made with a modest budget of less than 1 crore. Kammula wasn't sure of the outcome of the film and said "I knew that it would either be a huge hit or a huge flop". It evoked a decent response from the critics. Idlebrain.com gave the film a 3.75/5. The website review goes on to recommend this film to the film-going audiences. On the other hand, IndiaGlitz said that the film was "good, but could have been better". It also figured among the top five grossers in the Telugu film industry for the year 2004. The success of the films in India being measured in the number of days the film has been screened in the theatres, Anand completed 100 days of screening on 28 January 2005. Another website says that the film was realistic in its depiction and goes on to given instances in the film that do happen (unlike some of the fictitious and dreamy Indian films).

Home media

DVD

The DVD Release is a Special Edition 2 disc pack Released by KAD Entertainment.

Disc 1 contains the theatrical version of the film primarily with subtitles in English, both in Dolby Digital 5.1 and DTS. As an add-on, it also contains the Director's Cut, 35 minutes worth of deleted scenes.

Disc 2 contains a trivia game about the film, the saga of the film, that is, from the film Dollar Dreams where it all began to conceiving Anand, raising of finances for the film, selection of the cast and location, dubbing, choice of the music director, lyricist, cinematographer and choreographer. It also has a brief informational biography about the director, actors, about the choice of the caption, the encountered pre-release blues, the day of release, the best scene from the film, favourite song, memorable moments during the film, the post release scenario and the Director's Cut. It also contains the 100 days celebrations of the film with Dr. Dasari Narayana Rao's congratulatory speech. The film trailers are also included in this disc.

This film possibly is the first Telugu film to be released in a 2-Disc Special Edition DVD that also features the director's cut version of the film. KAD also won the best DVD award for this special edition.

Soundtrack
The film has six songs composed by K.M. Radha Krishnan, and according to one repository of Indian songs, "all the songs but for one assume classical and Carnatic music in it.". All songs were written by Veturi.

Awards
Nandi Awards - 2004
 Second Best Feature Film - Silver – Sekhar Kammula
 Best Director – Sekhar Kammula
 Best Actress – Kamalinee Mukherjee
 Best Supporting Actress – Satya Krishnan
 Best Child Artiste – Bakhita
 Best Female Dubbing Artist – Sunitha Upadrashta

Filmfare Awards South

Notes

References

External links
 
 Anand – Amigos Creations

2004 films
2000s Telugu-language films
Films scored by K. M. Radha Krishnan
2000s romantic musical films
2004 romantic drama films
Indian romantic musical films
Indian romantic drama films
Telugu films remade in other languages
Films directed by Sekhar Kammula